Étoile Sportive du Sahel H.C is a Tunisian handball team based in Sousse, that plays in Tunisian Professional Handball League.

Honours

National titles 
 Tunisian Handball League 9

 Tunisian Handball Cup 7

International titles 

African Handball Champions League 1 :

 Winners: 2010

 Runners-up : 2011

African Handball Cup Winners' Cup 2 :

 Winners: 2012

 Winners: 2019

 Third : 2013

African Handball Super Cup 1 :

 Winners: 2013
 Runners-up : 2011

Regional titles 

Arab Club Handball Championship 3 :

 Winners: 2001, 2004, 2015

Arab Handball Championship of Winners' Cup 3 :

 Winners: 2000, 2001, 2015
 Runners-up: 1996, 2002
 Third: 1999

Famous Former Players 
  Anouar Ayed
  Marouen Maggaiz
  Sobhi Saïed
  Selim Hedoui
  Abdelhak Ben Salah

Managers

Presidents

External links
 Site officiel de l'ESS (section handball)

Handball clubs established in 1963
Tunisian handball clubs